Alan Geoffrey Simons (born 2 September 1968) is a Welsh former football goalkeeper who played one game in the Football League for Port Vale in November 1987.

Career
Simons graduated through Port Vale juniors to sign professional forms with the team in September 1987, working as Mark Grew's understudy. He first team debut came in a 1–1 draw with Doncaster Rovers at Belle Vue on 7 November. He managed to get a game in the FA Cup, but was released from Vale Park by manager John Rudge in March 1988.

Career statistics
Source:

References

1968 births
Living people
Footballers from Wrexham
Welsh footballers
Association football goalkeepers
Port Vale F.C. players
English Football League players